Hart bei Graz is a municipality in the district of Graz-Umgebung in the Austrian state Styria.

Geography 
Hart lies in the east Styrian hills between Graz and Laßnitzhöhe.

The municipality consists of the Katastralgemeinden of Messendorf and Hart bei Sankt Peter as well as the communities of Hart, Messendorf, and Pachern.

Near Hart lies the palace of Lustbühel and the Technische Universität Graz (TU Graz).

References

Cities and towns in Graz-Umgebung District